Jared J. Grantham (1936-2017) was an American physician and nephrologist who was the founding editor of the Journal of the American Society of Nephrology and co-founder of the PKD Foundation. The Jared Grantham Kidney Institute at the University of Kansas Medical Center is named in his honor.

References

1936 births
2017 deaths
American nephrologists
American print editors
American founders
Date of birth missing
Date of death missing
Place of birth missing
Place of death missing